This is a list of professorships at the University of Cambridge.

During the early history of the University of Cambridge, the title professor simply denoted a doctor who taught in the university, a usage that continues to be found in, for example, US universities. However, from the 16th century onwards in Cambridge it was used to denote those holding "chairs" that had been founded by the university in a particular subject or endowed by a benefaction.

The university historically has made no formal distinction between established (or statutory) chairs and personal (or titular) chairs: all professorships are university offices formally established by a vote, and listed together as one class in the statutes. In practice, professorships can be established for a limited period of time or for a single tenure only, expiring after the first incumbent vacates office. It is common for permanent professorships to have originally been established for a single tenure, before being made permanent at a later date. This article only lists professorships which have had more than one incumbent, or which are not limited in duration.

The Regius Professorships are "royal" professorships, being created by the reigning monarch. The first five Regius Professorships, sometimes referred to as the Henrician Regius Professors, were granted arms and crests in 1590.

Professorships at the University of Cambridge

References

 
 

 
Professorships at the University of Cambridge
Professorships